Alexander McBrayer "Zander" Wiel (born January 11, 1993) is an American professional baseball outfielder and first baseman for the High Point Rockers of the Atlantic League of Professional Baseball. He was drafted by the Minnesota Twins in the 12th round of the 2015 Major League Baseball draft.

Early life and amateur career
Wiel was born and grew up in Murfreesboro, Tennessee and attended Blackman High School. Wiel was named first team All-District and first team All-Region each season from his sophomore year on.

Wiel redshirted his freshman season at Vanderbilt. As a redshirt freshman, he batted .305 with five home runs and 27 RBIs in 82 at bats. In his first full season as a starter Wiel batted .260 with five home runs and 44 RBIs as the Commodores won the 2014 College World Series. After the season he played summer baseball for the Sanford Mainers of the New England Collegiate Baseball League. As a redshirt junior he posted a .316 average with 14 home runs and a team-high 65 RBIs.

Professional career

Minnesota Twins
Wiel was selected in the 12th round of the 2015 MLB Draft by the Minnesota Twins. After signing he was assigned to the Elizabethton Twins of the rookie-level Appalachian League, hitting .194 in 13 games played before breaking his hand in July. The following season Wiel played for the Cedar Rapids Kernels of the Midwest League, playing in 128 games with a .259 batting average with 19 home runs, 86 RBIs and 75 runs scored. In 2017 he batted .250 with 13 home runs and 67 RBIs for the Fort Myers Miracle of the Class A Advanced Florida State League. Wiel began the 2018 season with the Chattanooga Lookouts of the Southern League and batted .311 with seven home runs and 58 RBIs and started in the Southern League All-Star Game. He earned a late season promotion to the AAA Rochester Red Wings. Wiel spent the 2019 season with Rochester and hit 40 doubles and 24 home runs with a .254 batting average.

Wiel did not play in a game in 2020 due to the cancellation of the minor league season because of the COVID-19 pandemic. Wiel was added to the Twins' 60-man player pool for the shortened MLB season, but did not make an appearance for the big league team. In 2021, Wiel 
played in 2 games for the Triple-A St. Paul Saints before landing on the injured list on May 12 with an undisclosed injury. The injury was later revealed to be a quadriceps injury, and Wiel was released by the Twins organization on August 25 after embarking on a rehab assignment.

High Point Rockers
On February 16, 2022, Wiel signed with the High Point Rockers of the Atlantic League of Professional Baseball.

Personal life
Wiel's father, Randy Wiel, was the head basketball coach at UNC-Asheville and Middle Tennessee State.

References

External links

1993 births
Living people
Baseball players from Tennessee
Vanderbilt Commodores baseball players
Baseball outfielders
Baseball first basemen
Elizabethton Twins players
Cedar Rapids Kernels players
Fort Myers Miracle players
Chattanooga Lookouts players
Rochester Red Wings players
St. Paul Saints players
High Point Rockers players
People from Murfreesboro, Tennessee